Hillcrest Colony is a Hutterite colony and census-designated place (CDP) in Clark County, South Dakota, United States. The population was 94 at the 2020 census. It was first listed as a CDP prior to the 2020 census.

It is in the northeast part of the county, on the southeast side of Dry Lake Number 1,  by road northeast of Clark, the county seat.

Demographics

References 

Census-designated places in Clark County, South Dakota
Census-designated places in South Dakota
Hutterite communities in the United States